Christopher Simon Codrington Crocker (born 25 January 1963) is an English former first-class cricketer. 

Crocker was born at Edgbaston in January 1963. He later studied at Jesus College, Oxford where he played first-class cricket for Oxford University in 1989, making a single appearance against Hampshire at Oxford. Batting twice in the match, he was dismissed for 7 runs in the Oxford first-innings by Cardigan Connor, while in their second-innings he was dismissed for 2 runs by Steve Andrew. Crocker also bowled a total of 27 wicketless overs across the match, conceding 40 runs.

References

External links

1963 births
Living people
People from Edgbaston
Alumni of Jesus College, Oxford
English cricketers
Oxford University cricketers